The Temple of Venus Genetrix (Latin: Templum Veneris Genetricis) is a ruined temple in the Forum of Caesar, Rome, dedicated to the Roman goddess Venus Genetrix, the founding goddess of the Julian gens. It was dedicated to the goddess on September 26, 46 BCE by Julius Caesar.

History
The forum and temple were perhaps planned as early as 54 BC, and construction began shortly thereafter.

On the eve of the Battle of Pharsalus, Caesar vowed the temple to Venus Victrix. He eventually decided to dedicate the temple to Venus Genetrix, the mother of Aeneas, and thus the mythical ancestress of the Julian family. The Temple was dedicated on 26 September 46 BC, the last day of Caesar's triumph. The forum and temple were eventually completed by Octavian.

The area was damaged by the fire in 80 AD. Later the temple was rebuilt by Domitian and was restored and rededicated by Trajan on 12 May 113 AD. It was then burned again in 283 AD, and again restored, this time by Diocletian. The three columns now visible belong to this later reconstruction.  If still in use by the 4th-century, it would have been closed during the persecution of pagans in the late Roman Empire.

Location and structure 
The temple originally sat up against the saddle that joined the Capitoline Hill to the Quirinal Hill.

The temple was built of brick faced with marble and had eight columns (octastyle) on the facade, and also eight columns on each side. The columns were spaced one and a half diameters apart (pycnostyle). The ceiling of the temple was vaulted. There were some nontraditional elements in the design of the temple such as the height of the podium it sat upon and the method of accessing it.

Access to the cella was afforded by circulation through the flanking arches, up narrow stairs on either side, to a landing in front of the temple, from which several more steps extending the width of the facade conducted to the cella level.It was placed at the far end of the court enclosed by the Forum, a standard practice among the Romans.

Adornment 

Items found inside the Temple include a statue of Venus by Arcesilas as well as statues of Julius Caesar. Numerous Greek paintings by Timomachus of Ajax and Medea, six collections of engraved gems, a breastplate decorated with pearls from Britannia, and a controversial golden statue of Cleopatra as the goddess Isis once filled the Temple.

The Temple was styled in Corinthian order. This included carved mouldings, capitals, and entablature. One of the mouldings, the cyma moulding, has carved dolphins, shells, and tridents. These particular symbols refer to Venus and the sea.

There were three fountain basins: one at the front of the facade and one on either corner of the Temple.

See also
 List of Ancient Roman temples
 List of ancient monuments in Rome

References 

46 BC
1st-century BC religious buildings and structures
Temples of Venus
Venus